Newberry Butte is a  summit located in the Grand Canyon, in Coconino County of northern Arizona, US. It is situated 4.5 miles north of the South Rim's Grandview Point, three miles southwest of Vishnu Temple, and 2.5 miles south of Wotans Throne. According to the Köppen climate classification system, Newberry Butte is located in a Cold semi-arid climate zone.

Etymology

Newberry Butte is named for John Strong Newberry (1822–1892), the geologist for an 1858 expedition headed by Lieutenant Joseph Christmas Ives which explored the Colorado River up to the lower Grand Canyon. After returning, Newberry convinced fellow geologist John Wesley Powell that a boat run through the Grand Canyon to complete the survey would be worth the risk. Powell would later lead the Powell Geographic Expedition of 1869 to explore the region. This geographical feature's name was officially adopted in 1906 by the U.S. Board on Geographic Names.

Geology

This butte is an erosional remnant composed of Mississippian Redwall Limestone, which overlays the Cambrian Tonto Group. Precipitation runoff from Newberry Butte drains southwest to the Colorado River via Vishnu Creek.

Gallery

See also
 Geology of the Grand Canyon area
 Solomon Temple

References

External links 

 Weather forecast: National Weather Service
 Newberry Butte photo by Harvey Butchart

Grand Canyon
Landforms of Coconino County, Arizona
Buttes of Arizona
North American 1000 m summits
Colorado Plateau
Grand Canyon National Park